Martin “Marty” Edward Dempsey (born March 14, 1952), is a retired United States Army general who served as the 18th chairman of the Joint Chiefs of Staff from October 1, 2011 until September 25, 2015. He previously served as the 37th chief of Staff of the Army from April 11, 2011, to September 7, 2011. Before that, he served as Commanding General, U.S. Army Training and Doctrine Command, from December 8, 2008, to April 11, 2011, as Acting Commander, U.S. Central Command, from March 24, 2008, to October 30, 2008, as Deputy Commander, U.S. Central Command, from August 2007 to March 23, 2008, and as Commanding General, Multi-National Security Transition Command – Iraq (MNSTC-I), from August 2005 to August 2007.  Dempsey assumed his assignment as Chairman of the Joint Chiefs of Staff on October 1, 2011 and stepped down from the Chairmanship on September 25, 2015. He has served as a professor at Duke University and as chairman of USA Basketball.

Early life
Dempsey was born on March 14, 1952, in Jersey City, New Jersey, and grew up in nearby Bayonne. He attended John S. Burke Catholic High School in Goshen, New York. Dempsey is Irish American. Following high school, Dempsey attended the United States Military Academy at West Point and graduated with the Class of 1974. Dempsey's four grandparents were born in the counties of Sligo, Donegal, Mayo and Roscommon in Ireland. He learned a small amount of the Irish language while spending his summers in Ireland as a child.

Career
Dempsey received a commission as an Armor officer upon graduation from the United States Military Academy in 1974. As a company-grade officer, he served in 1st Squadron, 2d Armored Cavalry Regiment as the officer in charge for personnel. He went on to be the executive officer of the 3rd Brigade 3rd Armored Division during Operation Desert Shield/Storm. As a captain, Dempsey was the commanding officer of Alpha Troop, 1/10 Armored Cavalry at Ft. Carson, CO. As a lieutenant colonel he commanded the 4th Battalion of the 67th Armored Regiment "Bandits" from 1992 to 1995 in the 1st Armored Division in Friedberg, Hesse, Germany.

In 1996 he took command of the 3d Armored Cavalry Regiment. Following that assignment as the Army's “senior scout,” he served as an Assistant Deputy Director for Strategic Plans and Policy (J-5) on the Joint Staff, and as Special Assistant to the Chairman of the Joint Chiefs of Staff, General Henry H. Shelton, USA. During this period of his career, he attended both the Army Command and General Staff College and the National War College, earning master's degrees in military art and national strategic studies.

Promoted to brigadier general in August 2001, Dempsey first served in the Kingdom of Saudi Arabia training and advising the Saudi Arabian National Guard.

In June 2003, then Major General Dempsey assumed command of the 1st Armored Division. He succeeded Ricardo S. Sanchez who was promoted to lieutenant general, as commander of V Corps. Dempsey's command of the 1st Armored Division lasted until July 2005 and included 13 months in Iraq, from June 2003 to July 2004.  While in Iraq, 1st Armored Division, in addition to its own brigades, had operational command over the 2nd Armored Cavalry Regiment and a brigade of the 82nd Airborne Division; the command, called "Task Force Iron" in recognition of the Division's nickname, "Old Ironsides", was the largest division-level command in the history of the United States Army.

It was during this time that the U.S. intervention in Iraq changed dramatically as Fallujah fell to Sunni extremists and supporters of Muqtada al-Sadr built their strength and rose against American forces.  Then Major General Dempsey and his command assumed responsibility for the area of operations in Baghdad as the insurgency incubated, grew, and exploded.  General Dempsey has been described by Thomas Ricks in his book "Fiasco": "In the capital itself, the 1st Armored Division, after Sanchez assumed control of V Corps, was led by Maj. Gen. Martin Dempsey, was generally seen as handling a difficult (and inherited) job well, under the global spotlight of Baghdad."

On March 27, 2007, Lieutenant General Dempsey was transferred from commander of Multi-National Security Transition Command-Iraq, and reassigned as deputy commander of U.S. Central Command at MacDill Air Force Base, Florida.

On February 5, 2008, Dempsey was nominated to head the U.S. Army, Europe/Seventh Army, and was nominated for promotion to four-star general upon Senate approval.

On March 11, 2008, Dempsey's commander, Admiral William J. Fallon, retired from active service. U.S. Secretary of Defense Robert Gates accepted this as effective on March 31. Dempsey took over command as acting commander of Central Command.

On March 13, 2008, Dempsey was confirmed by the United States Senate as Commander, U.S. Army, Europe/Seventh Army. However, due, to Admiral Fallon's unexpected retirement, Dempsey never took command of U.S. Army, Europe/Seventh Army.

On July 11, 2008, Dempsey was nominated to take command of U.S. Army Training and Doctrine Command while Lieutenant General Carter F. Ham replaced his nomination to command the U.S. Army, Europe/Seventh Army.

On December 8, 2008, Dempsey assumed command of United States Army Training and Doctrine Command.

On January 6, 2011, Defense Secretary Robert Gates announced that he would recommend that the President nominate General Dempsey to succeed General George Casey as the Army Chief of Staff. On February 8, 2011, Gates announced that President Barack Obama nominated Dempsey to be the 37th Chief of Staff of the United States Army. On March 3, 2011, Dempsey testified before the United States Senate Committee on Armed Services, and on March 15, 2011, the committee affirmatively reported Dempsey's nomination. On March 16, 2011, the Senate confirmed Dempsey's nomination by unanimous consent. On April 11, 2011, Dempsey was sworn in as Chief of Staff of the United States Army at a ceremony at Fort Myer.

With Admiral Michael Mullen set to retire as Chairman of the Joint Chiefs of Staff in September 2011, U.S. President Obama needed to select his replacement. The vice-chairman, Marine General James Cartwright, who was initially believed to be the front runner for the job, had fallen out of favor among senior officials in the Defense Department. Obama administration officials revealed on May 26, 2011, that the President would nominate Dempsey to the post of chairman. In August 2011, General Dempsey was confirmed by unanimous consent to succeed Admiral Mike Mullen as the next chairman of the Joint Chiefs of Staff. He was sworn in as 18th chairman of the Joint Chiefs of Staff on October 1, 2011. On June 26, 2013, President Barack Obama re-nominated General Dempsey to serve a second two-year term as chairman. Dempsey stepped down on September 25, 2015, and was replaced by General Joseph Dunford, USMC.

Dempsey was appointed as the chairman of USA Basketball, for a term between 2017 and 2020, and is an NBA representative.

On October 18, 2020, Dempsey was inducted into the New Jersey Hall of Fame, in the Public Service category.

Personal life 
Dempsey is married to his high school sweetheart, Deanie. They have three children: Chris, Megan, and Caitlin. Each has served in the United States Army and is married with three children. Chris remains on active duty as a cavalry lieutenant colonel in 1st Battalion 66th Armored Regiment, 3rd Armored Brigade, 4th Infantry Division (United States). Martin and Deanie have nine grandchildren.

Education 
1974 Bachelor of Science degree, U.S. Military Academy, West Point, New York
1984 Master of Arts degree in English, Duke University, Durham, North Carolina
1988 Master of Military Art and Science degree, United States Army Command and General Staff College
1995 Master of Science degree in national security and strategic studies, National War College

Dates of rank

Awards and decorations
On December 7, 2011, Dempsey received the USO's Distinguished Service Award on behalf of all military members. In October 2016, he was made an honorary Knight Commander of the Order of the British Empire by Queen Elizabeth II, for commitment to British-American defense cooperation. Also, the Association of the United States Army, on October 17, 2019 awarded Dempsey the George Catlett Marshall Medal for distinguished public service, that organization's highest award.

Medals and ribbons

Bibliography

 Win, Learn, Focus, Adapt, Win Again – Article series for Army Magazine (AUSA). October 2010 – February 2011
 Inspired and humbled by the sacrifice of our troops – The Hill, May 24, 2011
 From the Chairman – Joint Force Quarterly no. 64. January 2012
 From the Chairman – Joint Force Quarterly no. 65. April 2012
 Preserving the bonds of trust – The Hill, May 22, 2012
 From the Chairman – Joint Force Quarterly no. 66. July 2012
 From the Chairman: Building Tomorrow's Leaders – Joint Force Quarterly no. 67. October 2012
 From the Chairman: Sustaining our Edge – Joint Force Quarterly no. 68. January 2013
 From the Chairman: Risky Business – Joint Force Quarterly no. 69. April 2013
 Remember and uphold tradition – The Hill, May 21, 2013
 From the Chairman: Why We Serve – Joint Force Quarterly no. 70. July 2013
 From the Chairman: Leadership in Historic Times – Joint Force Quarterly no. 71. October 2013
 From the Chairman: Mount Up and Move Out – Joint Force Quarterly no. 72. January 2014

Interviews
 Dempsey Muses on Challenges as New Head of Joint Chiefs – Thom Shanker. New York Times. Oct 3, 2011.
 The New Chairman of the Joint Chiefs of Staff on "Getting to the Truth" – Karl Moore. Forbes Magazine. Oct 20, 2011.
 Gen. Martin Dempsey's Interview with Jeremy Paxman – Jeremy Paxman, BBC. Nov 28, 2011.
 Transcript: Gen. Martin Dempsey's Interview with Fareed Zakaria – Fareed Zakaria. CNN. Feb 19, 2012.
 Video: Gen. Martin Dempsey's Interview with Charlie Rose – Charlie Rose. Mar 16, 2012.
 Video: Gen. Martin Dempsey's Interview on Leadership – The Pentagon Channel. October 2012.
 Video: Gen. Martin Dempsey at the National Press Club – National Press Club. October 10, 2012.
 Transcript: Gen. Martin Dempsey talks to Dan Rather – Dan Rather Reports. AXS.tv. November 13, 2012.
 Transcript: Gen. Martin Dempsey talks to Ted Koppel – Rock Center with Brian Williams. NBC. January 24, 2013.
 Transcript: Sec. Panetta & Gen. Dempsey's Interview with Candy Crowley – State of the Union. CNN. February 3, 2013.
 Transcript: Sec. Panetta & Gen. Dempsey's Interview with Chuck Todd – Meet the Press. NBC. February 3, 2013.
 Transcript: Gen. Martin Dempsey talks to Rachel Martin – Weekend Edition. NPR. February 17, 2013.
 Transcript: Gen. Martin Dempsey talks to Candy Crowley – State of the Union. CNN. July 7, 2013.
 Transcript: Gen. Martin Dempsey talks to Martha Raddatz – This Week. ABC. August 4, 2013.
  Transcript: Gen. Martin Dempsey talks to Steve Inskeep - NPR. Morning Edition. June 4, 2020.

Speeches
 Gen. Dempsey Becomes the 18th Chairman of the Joint Chiefs of Staff – September 30, 2011
 The Atlantic Council of the United States: Security and Partnership in an Age of Austerity – December 9, 2011.
 End of Mission Ceremony in Baghdad, Iraq – December 15, 2011.
 Duke University's Ambassador S. Davis Phillips Family International Lecture Series: A New Vision for the US Military – January 12, 2012.
 West Point Class of 2013 500th Night – January 21, 2012.
 Harvard University's John F. Kennedy Jr. Forum: Security Paradox – April 12, 2012.
 The Carnegie Endowment for International Peace: A Conversation with General Martin Dempsey – May 1, 2012.
 Kansas State University's 161st Landon Lecture – October 1, 2012

References

External links 

Military biography
Chairman's Corner 

|-

|-

|-

|-

|-

|-

|-

1952 births
Living people
People from Jersey City, New Jersey
American people of Irish descent
Chairmen of the Joint Chiefs of Staff
United States Army Chiefs of Staff
Duke University alumni
Military personnel from New Jersey
National War College alumni
People from Bayonne, New Jersey
Recipients of the Defense Distinguished Service Medal
Recipients of the Defense Superior Service Medal
Recipients of the Distinguished Service Medal (US Army)
Recipients of the Legion of Merit
Knights Commander of the Order of Merit of the Federal Republic of Germany
Tank personnel
United States Army generals
United States Military Academy alumni
United States Army Command and General Staff College alumni
Honorary Knights Commander of the Order of the British Empire
Recipients of the Navy Distinguished Service Medal
Recipients of the Air Force Distinguished Service Medal
Recipients of the Coast Guard Distinguished Service Medal